The New Guinean planigale (Planigale novaeguineae), also known as the Papuan planigale, is a species of small marsupial carnivore native to the Trans-Fly savanna and grasslands of New Guinea.

References

Dasyuromorphs
Mammals of Papua New Guinea
Mammals of Western New Guinea
Mammals described in 1941
Marsupials of New Guinea